Events from the year 1962 in France.

Incumbents
President: Charles de Gaulle 
Prime Minister: Michel Debré (until 14 April), Georges Pompidou (starting 14 April)

Events
3 February – Liner SS France begins her maiden voyage with the Compagnie Générale Transatlantique to New York.
5 February – President Charles de Gaulle calls for Algeria to be granted independence.
8 February – Charonne (Paris Métro) Massacre.
18 March – Evian agreements are signed by France and the F.L.N. ending the Algerian War.
19 March – Formal cease-fire comes into operation following Evian Accords, however, the OAS continues its terrorist attacks against Algerians.
24 March – OAS leader Edmond Jouahud is arrested in Oran.
26 March – France shortens the term for military service from 26 months to 18.
8 April – Évian Accords referendum held and adopted with a majority of 90%.
13 April – OAS leader Edmond Jouhaud is sentenced to death.
20 April – OAS leader Raoul Salan is arrested in Algiers.
2 May – An OAS bomb explodes in Algeria – this and other attacks kill 110 and injure 147.
23 May – Raoul Salan, founder of the Organisation armée secrète, is sentenced to life imprisonment.
29 May – Negotiations between the OAS and the FLA lead to a real armistice in Algeria.
3 June – Air France charter flight Chateau de Sully, a Boeing 707, over-runs the runway at Orly Airport in Paris; 130 of 132 passengers are killed, two flight attendants survive.
17 June – The OAS signs a truce with the FLN in Algeria, but a day later announces that it will continue the fight on behalf of French Algerians.
22 June – An Air France Boeing 707 jet crashes into terrain during bad weather in Guadeloupe, West Indies, killing all 113 on board.
30 June – The last soldiers of the French Foreign Legion leave Algeria.
1 July – Supporters of Algerian independence win 99% majority in a referendum.
2 July – Charles de Gaulle accepts Algerian independence; France recognizes it the next day.
5 July – Algeria becomes independent from France.
5 July – Oran massacre takes place in Algeria.
20 July – France and Tunisia reestablish diplomatic relations.
31 July – Algeria proclaims independence.
22 August – A failed assassination attempt is made against President Charles de Gaulle.
5 October – The French National Assembly censures the proposed referendum to sanction presidential elections by popular mandate; Prime Minister Georges Pompidou resigns, but President de Gaulle asks him to stay in office.
28 October – Presidential Election Referendum held, favours the election of the president by universal suffrage.
18 November – Legislative Election held.
25 November – Legislative Election held.
27 November – President Charles De Gaulle orders Georges Pompidou to form a government.
29 November – An agreement is signed between Britain and France to develop the Concorde supersonic airliner.

Arts and literature
18 March – "Un premier amour" by Isabelle Aubret (music by Claude-Henri Vic, text by Roland Stephane Valade) wins the Eurovision Song Contest 1962 for France.

Sport
24 June–15 July – Tour de France, won by Jacques Anquetil.

Births

January to March
8 January – Nelly Viennot, soccer referee
21 January -
Isabelle Nanty, actress
Marie Trintignant, actress (died 2003)
25 January – Bruno Martini, soccer player (died 2020)
28 January – Philippe Vercruysse, international soccer player
1 February – Manuel Amoros, international soccer player
2 February – Philippe Claudel, writer
14 February
Philippe Sella, international rugby union player
Thierry Toutain, race walker
17 February – Walter Ciofani, hammer thrower
20 February – Pierre Quinon, pole vaulter and Olympic gold medallist (died 2011)
22 February – Olivier Latry, organist, improviser and Professor of Organ
18 March – Vincent Barteau, cyclist
21 March – Gilles Lalay, motorcycle enduro and rally raid competitor (died 1992)
25 March – Pierre Morice, soccer player

April to June
2 April – Pierre Carles, documentarist
2 May -
Jean-François Bernard, cyclist 
Alexandra Boulat, photographer (died 2007)
28 May – François-Henri Pinault, businessman
31 May – Philippe Gache, motor racing driver
7 June – Thierry Hazard, singer
12 June – Philippe Tibeuf, soccer player
June – Pascal Riché, journalist

July to September
22 July -
Jacques Glassmann, soccer player
Jean-Claude Leclercq, cyclist 
23 July – Alain Lefèvre, pianist and composer
28 July – Emmanuelle Jouannet, international law professor
6 August – Marc Lavoine, singer and actor
7 August – Alain Robert, rock and urban climber
15 August – Paul Henderson, Australian politician and Chief Minister of the Northern Territory
19 August – Valérie Kaprisky, actress
27 August – Fabrice Poullain, soccer player
30 August – François Delecour, rally driver
11 September – Pierre Huyghe, artist
20 September – Jean-Louis Garcia, soccer player
25 September – Juliette Noureddine, singer, songwriter and composer
27 September – Christelle Guignard, alpine skier

October to December
4 October – Jean-Luc Sassus, soccer player (died 2015)
13 October – Valérie Létard, politician
15 October – Guy Georges, serial killer
17 October – Yvon Pouliquen, soccer manager, former player
22 October – Laurent Paganelli, journalist, former soccer player
24 October – Yves Bertucci, soccer manager
30 October – Arnaud Montebourg, politician
2 November – Mireille Delunsch, opera soprano
11 November – Thierry Goudet, soccer manager, former player
13 November – Lydia Gouardo, rape victim 
23 November – Philippe Renaud, canoer and Olympic medallist
6 December – Claude Chirac, younger daughter of French president Jacques Chirac
7 December – Alain Blondel, decathlete
17 December – Christophe Hondelatte, television and radio host
26 December – Jean-Marc Ferreri, international soccer player
28 December – Michel Petrucciani, jazz pianist (died 1999)

Full date unknown
Luc Delahaye, photographer
Philippe Goitschel, skier and Olympic medallist
Martin Matje, French illustrator
Dominique Moulon, historian of art and technology
Pascale Sourisse, businesswoman

Deaths

January to March
8 January – Roger Ducret, fencer and Olympic gold medallist (born 1888)
21 January – Georges Gimel, painter (born 1898)
24 January – André Lhote, sculptor and painter (born 1885)
4 February -
Charles Basle, motor racing driver (born 1885)
Daniel Halévy, historian (born 1872)
5 February – Jacques Ibert, composer (born 1890)
19 February – Émile Armand, individualist anarchist (born 1872)
3 March – Pierre Benoit, novelist (born 1886)
6 March – René Laforgue, psychiatrist and psychoanalyst (born 1894)

April to June
1 April – Jules Boucherit, violinist and teacher (born 1877)
10 April – Lucienne Delyle, singer (born 1917; leukemia)
17 April – Pierre Larquey, actor (born 1884)
4 May – Cécile Vogt-Mugnier, neurologist (born 1875)
23 May – Louis Coatalen, automobile engineer (born 1879)
1 June – Joseph Darnand, Bishop (born 1879)
5 June – Jacques Gréber, architect (born 1882)
6 June – Yves Klein, artist (born 1928)
8 June – Eugène Freyssinet, structural and civil engineer (born 1879)

July to September
1 July – Edgard de Larminat, General (born 1895)
8 July – Georges Bataille, writer (born 1897)
18 July – Eugene Houdry, mechanical engineer (born 1892)
25 July – Paul Aymé, tennis player (born 1869)
18 August – Lucien Berland, entomologist and arachnologist (born 1888)
19 August – Jean Lucienbonnet, motor racing driver (born 1923)
22 August – Charles Rigoulot, weightlifter, professional wrestler, race car driver and actor (born 1903)
August – Léon Binoche, rugby union player (born 1878)
21 September – Princess Marie Bonaparte, psychoanalyst (born 1882)
24 September – Félix Goethals, cyclist (born 1891)
28 September – Roger Nimier, novelist (born 1925)

October to December
2 October – Madeleine Fournier-Sarlovèze, golfer (born 1873)
7 October – Henri Oreiller, alpine skier and Olympic gold medallist (born 1925)
14 October – Jacques Majorelle, painter (born 1886)
16 October – Gaston Bachelard, philosopher (born 1884)
17 October – Natalia Goncharova, Russian-born avant-garde artist (born 1881)
30 October – Yvette Andréyor, actress (born 1891)
31 October -
Gabrielle Renaudot Flammarion, astronomer (born 1877)
Louis Massignon, scholar of Islam and its history (born 1883)
20 November -
Henri Déricourt, pilot and accused double agent (born 1909)
Philippe Kieffer, Naval officer (born 1899)
22 November – René Coty, politician, President of France (born 1882)
26 November – Albert Sarraut, politician, twice Prime Minister of France (born 1872)
19 December – Jean-Marie Charles Abrial, Admiral and Minister (born 1879)

Full date unknown
Louis Gernet, philologist and sociologist (born 1882)
Élisée Maclet, painter (born 1881)
Jacques Maroger, painter (born 1884)

See also
 1962 in French television
 List of French films of 1962

References

1960s in France